The Female may refer to:

 The Female (1924 film), a 1924 American silent film directed by Sam Wood
 The Female (1959 film), a 1959 French-Italian drama film directed by Julien Duvivier

See also
 Female (disambiguation)